Angel Joy Blue (born May 3, 1984), is an American opera soprano. She won the Grammy Award for Best Opera Recording for the Metropolitan Opera production of Porgy and Bess in the 63rd Annual Grammy Awards. Her voice has been recognized for its shining and agile upper register, "smoky" middle register, beautiful timbre, and ability to switch from a classical to a contemporary sound. She has performed internationally and won numerous awards including a Grammy Award, Operalia and Miss Hollywood. According to family lore, her father Sylvester predicted her to be "the next Leontyne Price" when she was born.

Education 
Blue received a Bachelor of Music from the University of Redlands in 2005 and a Master of Music degree in Opera Performance from UCLA in 2007. She is an alumna of the Los Angeles County High School for the Arts where she studied voice and classical piano. She was a member of the Domingo-Thornton Young Artist Program at Los Angeles Opera from 2007/2009. Blue was a member of the Artistas de la Academia del Palau de les Arts from 2009 to 2010, under Maestros Alberto Zedda, Lorin Maazel, and Zubin Mehta.

Pageants 
Blue is a former model and beauty queen. She was the first African-American to hold the title of Miss Apple Valley, California. She has held titles such as Miss Hollywood 2005, and 1st runner up to both Miss California 2006 and Miss Nevada 2007 and finished 2nd runner up at Miss California 2005.

Career 
She has performed lead roles and as a featured soloist at the Metropolitan Opera, Teatro alla Scala, Royal Opera House, Vienna State Opera, Canadian Opera Company (Toronto), Los Angeles Opera, San Francisco Opera, Walt Disney Concert Hall, the Colburn School, Royce Hall, the Staples Center, Theater an der Wien, Frankfurt Opera, Munich Philharmonic, Berlin Philharmonic, Israeli Philharmonic, Auditorio Nacional de Música, Seoul Arts Center.

Her operatic repertoire includes such roles as Violetta (La traviata), Musetta and Mimì (La bohème), Micaëla (Carmen), Lucia (Lucia di Lammermoor), Helena (A Midsummer Night's Dream),  Liu (Turandot), Manon (Manon), Contessa Almaviva (Le nozze di Figaro), Giulietta and Antonia (The Tales of Hoffmann), Dido (Dido and Aeneas), and Donna Elvira (Don Giovanni).

Blue has sung the National Anthem for the Border Governors Conference, hosted by California Governor Arnold Schwarzenegger, and for the California Women's Conference, hosted by California First Lady Maria Shriver.

In the 2008/09 season, Blue made her debut with the San Francisco Opera Company as Clara in Porgy and Bess; she was the featured soloist with the Valdosta Symphony in Valdosta, Georgia, where she sang the soprano role in Arthur Honegger's King David; and she also performed scenes from La traviata (Violetta) with the Korean Symphony Orchestra Germany in Seoul and Busan, Korea. In the 2009/10 season, she was a featured soloist with the Riverside Philharmonic; the Adrian Symphony in Adrian, Michigan; Giro Italia tour with Alberto Zedda throughout Italy; Madrilenos por Haiti concert with La Orquesta Clasica de Espana in Madrid; A Gala Evening with Thomas Hampson in Budapest, Hungary; and she made her debut at the Palau de les Arts Reina Sofía as Micaëla in Carmen, opposite Marcelo Álvarez and Elīna Garanča, conducted by Zubin Mehta. Throughout the 2010/11 season, Blue enjoyed engagements with the Palau de les Arts in Valencia, Spain; the American Youth Symphony; the Redlands Symphony; and the Theatre an der Wien in Vienna, Austria where she sang the role of Giulietta in the Tales of Hoffmann directed by Oscar-winning director William Friedkin. She began touring with Plácido Domingo in 2011 opening the Kaufmann Center in Kansas City, Missouri; the Royal Opera House Muscat, Oman, and concerts in Beijing, China, as well as Zagreb, Croatia. In 2020 she sang Bess in Porgy and Bess with the Metropolitan Opera in New York for their first performance of that opera in 30 years.

Blue was a finalist in Operalia 2009, receiving 1st place in the Zarzuela competition, and 2nd place in the Opera competition. In July 2010, Blue was honored to be a part of the 17th Annual Verbier Festival in Switzerland, where she sang in an "Operalia Tribute" Concert sponsored by Rolex. She has also received awards from the Metropolitan Opera National Council Regional Auditions, A.E.I.O.U Italian Educators Vocal Competition, the Dorothy Chandler Pavilion's Emerging Young Entertainers Award, and the Redlands Bowl Competition.

In upcoming seasons Blue revisits Clara in Porgy and Bess in concert with the Berlin Philharmonic and Sir Simon Rattle; returns to the Frankfurt Opera as the Dritte Norn in Richard Wagner's Götterdämmerung; and performs Musetta, La bohème, for the English National Opera. Concert performances will take place in Europe, including Carmina Burana at the Maggio Musicale with Zubin Mehta, Mahler's Symphony No. 2 with the Munich Philharmonic, Verdi's Greatest Hits concert with the Santa Barbara Symphony, Verdi Requiem with the Cincinnati Symphony Orchestra and St. Louis Symphony Orchestra under the direction of Raphael Frühbeck de Burgos, and the release of her first solo album with British pianist Iain Burnside. She was the only soloist invited to sing for the American Friends of the Israeli Philharmonic in a Tribute Concert to honor the film composer Hans Zimmer.

She made her Metropolitan Opera début in 2017 as Mimì in La bohème.

Repertoire

Opera

Concerts

News

Awards 

 Richard Tucker Award, 2022.
 Grammy Award for Best Opera Recording for the Metropolitan Opera production of Porgy and Bess in the 63rd Annual Grammy Awards.
 The Eva and Marc Stern Artist Award, 2021
 Beverly Sills Award, Metropolitan Opera, 2020.

In 2009, Blue was a finalist in Operalia, receiving 1st place in the zarzuela competition, and 2nd place in the opera competition. She has also received awards from the Metropolitan Opera National Council Auditions, the Dorothy Chandler Pavilion's Emerging Young Entertainers Award, and the Redlands Bowl Competition. Los Angeles County Board of Supervisors Achievement Award January 21, 2014, given by Los Angeles County Board of Supervisors.

Philanthropy 
In 2010 Blue was a featured soloist on the Madrileños por Haití concert with the Orquesta Clásica de España in Madrid, Spain. The concert was dedicated to raising funds for housing projects for Haitians who have relocated to the Dominican Republic.

In March 2014 Blue took part in the annual AIDS Gala in Düsseldorf, Germany. The gala raised €142,000 to help those affected by AIDS and HIV in both Germany and South Africa.

References

External links
 
 

1984 births
Living people
American operatic sopranos
Singers from California
University of Redlands alumni
Operalia, The World Opera Competition prize-winners
Los Angeles County High School for the Arts alumni
21st-century African-American women singers
21st-century American women opera singers
African-American women opera singers
Classical musicians from California
Grammy Award winners